Killybegs was a constituency represented in the Irish House of Commons until 1800.

History
In the Patriot Parliament of 1689 summoned by James II, Killybegs was not represented.

Members of Parliament, 1616–1801

1689–1801
1634–1635 Thomas Tallys and James Galbraith
1639–1649 Edward Tarleton and Thomas Tallys
1661 Sir Robert Murray and William Knight (sat for Belfast - replaced by Thomas Burton. Burton AWOL-replaced 1665 by Sir John Lyndon)

Notes

References

Bibliography

Constituencies of the Parliament of Ireland (pre-1801)
Historic constituencies in County Donegal
1616 establishments in Ireland
1800 disestablishments in Ireland
Constituencies established in 1616
Constituencies disestablished in 1800